FreezeDried was a polka band from Chicago that brought Polish push-style polkas to the polka and non-polka fan.  They were known throughout the field to be on the cutting edge of polka music.  FreezeDried mixed polkas with other music styles such as Latin music, zydeco, gospel music, dixieland music and rock music. Their efforts have inspired other traditional polka bands to be more creative in their approach to new material, musical arrangements and showmanship. FreezeDried did not stop at their quest for musical diversity. In 2006, FreezeDried continued to progress in the vocal area by adding a female vocal trio. Affectionately known as "The Icicles", the singers bring flavors of motown and soul to the FreezeDried sound. The band broke up, however, in 2020.

FreezeDried members are Ted Okrzesik Jr., John Krawisz, John Okrzesik Sr., Dan Okrzesik Sr., A.J. Okrzesik, and Andrew Okrzesik. The record label of FreezeDried is Chrome Pierogi Recording and is an Indie label. Since 1998, venues such as the Taste of Chicago, Minnesota State Fair, WGN radio, numerous town summer fests, and an array of local clubs have been enjoying the fresh sounds of the FreezeDried experience.

Discography

Bodacious Ditties     2019
DegenerationGap     2009
Fear of Rubber Cushions     2006
Deliberate Confusion     2003
Artistically Challenged;     2000

References

American polka groups